Magnus Brekke Henriksen (born 17 April 1996) is a Norwegian ice hockey player for Vålerenga Ishockey and the Norwegian national team.

He represented Norway at the 2021 IIHF World Championship.

References

External links

1996 births
Living people
Lørenskog IK players
Norwegian ice hockey centres
People from Lørenskog
Vålerenga Ishockey players
Sportspeople from Viken (county)